WSWW-FM (95.7 FM) is a country music formatted broadcast radio station licensed to Craigsville, West Virginia, serving the Summersville/Webster Springs/Richwood area. WSWW-FM is owned by WVRC Media and licensed to AJG Corporation.

WSWW-FM previously simulcast the format of WJLS 560 AM Beckley.

On August 8, 2022, WSWW-FM dropped its simulcast with WJLS and changed its format to country, branded as "Lake Country 95.7 3WS".

Previous logo

References

External links
Lake Country 95.7 3WS

SWW-FM
Radio stations established in 2008
2008 establishments in West Virginia
Country radio stations in the United States